WRBQ-FM (104.7 FM, "Q105") is a commercial classic hits music formatted radio station in Tampa, Florida. Owned by Beasley Broadcast Group, its studios are in St. Petersburg while its transmitter is in Palm River-Clair Mel.

History

Top 40 (1973-1993) 
Formerly beautiful music-formatted WPKM and later WEZX, 104.7 switched to a Top 40 format as WRBQ ("Q105") on December 13, 1973. The first song on "Q105" was "If You're Ready (Come Go with Me)" by The Staple Singers. Beginning in 1977, Cleveland Wheeler served as morning deejay and radio personality. The station hired Scott Shannon as program director in 1981; Shannon and Wheeler soon developed the first morning zoo radio show in the U.S. The two decided to break with tradition and work up a wilder show together, founded on their own playful, irreverent and provocative interaction, with spontaneous bits of parody and comedy leavened with straight news. They called the show the Q Morning Zoo, and it quickly became a hit. At its height, it had 85 people working to produce it. Dave Saint, Jack Harris, Bill Garcia, Uncle Johnny, Alan O’Brien, Tedd Webb, Pat McKay, Steve Kelly, and Mason Dixon were all involved with the station as on-air personalities. Q105 quickly overtook WLCY-FM, which had signed on three years earlier with an automated rock format.

According to engineer Ralph Beaver, the station's call sign was created when they were looking for a set of unique call letters and tossing out ideas, he suggested ‘RB’ (which happened to be his initials). Southern Broadcasting, which then owned the station, had just signed on WRVQ in Richmond, Virginia, and ‘RB’ was available, creating a call sign that sounded similar to its sister station.

When it signed on, WRBQ-FM was owned by Southern Broadcasting. In 1978, the station was purchased by Harte-Hanks, then in 1983, by Edens Broadcasting, headed by former Southern Broadcasting and Harte-Hanks executive Gary Edens. WRBQ would add an AM simulcast on 1380 AM that same year.

For 20 years, Q105 was a Top 40 station, and dominated in the ratings in Tampa. The station was able to maintain its popularity until 1989, when crosstown Oldies station WFLZ-FM changed to an aggressive Top 40/CHR format called Power 93, The Power Pig. Part of WFLZ's plan was to mock and belittle Q105; the main aspect of their campaign were billboards all over Tampa saying "Screw The Q" with the letter "Q" and a large screw through it.

Q105 continued on against The Power Pig for a few more years, but was unable to regain the ratings they once enjoyed, despite moving in a rhythmic direction (much like WFLZ) in April 1990, and then moving towards an adult lean in February 1993. In addition, Edens was also running into financial trouble, partially related due to the fallout from WFLZ's competition. In January 1992, WRBQ (AM) split from the simulcast and flipped to the satellite-fed urban AC service "The Touch". Also in 1992, Edens decided to sell all of their stations; WRBQ-AM-FM were purchased by Clear Channel Communications in July of that year.

Country (1993-2002) 
At 1:05 p.m. on April 2, 1993, after playing "Real Love" by Jody Watley and "Happy Trails" by Roy Rogers, WRBQ-FM flipped to a country format (which began with a weekend stunt of all-Garth Brooks music), keeping the "Q105" name and logo (albeit colored in a red, white and blue motif). The switch to country was an immediate ratings success, climbing from 13th all the way to 2nd, beating every station except then-rival (now sister station) country competitor WQYK-FM. WRBQ, which would be briefly renamed "105 The Bee" in the late 1990s, continued as a successful country radio station until the early 2000s.

In February 1999, as a result of the merger of Clear Channel and Jacor, WRBQ was sold to Infinity Broadcasting, now CBS Radio, and became WQYK's sister station. (Its AM counterpart was sold to ABC and flipped to Radio Disney.)

Oldies (2002-2005) 
On April 18, 2002, under the lobbying of former WRBQ Program Director Mason Dixon, who was Program Director of WRBQ's sister station WYUU (which at the time was an oldies station), WRBQ and WYUU swapped formats. WYUU became "Country 92.5" (WYUU later dropped country for a Hispanic format in 2005), while WRBQ became an oldies station.

Classic Hits (2005-present) 
The station returned to the "Q105" branding in July 2005, tweaking the format to classic hits ("The Greatest Hits of All Time").

In 2008, Scott Walker was hired to be WRBQ's on air Program Director and midday host. This was done to allow Mason Dixon to focus entirely on his morning show duties. In 2013, Brian Thomas programmed WRBQ and sister station WQYK for a short period of time. Tee Gentry would later take over programming duties on an interim basis; Ted Cannarozzi would become the official PD in January 2016.

In recent years, WRBQ-FM has brought back jingles from its CHR days on the air.  These include cuts from the "Positron", "Outstanding", "The Rock", "FM", "The Flame Thrower", "Warp Factor,", "Red Hot", "Power Station", "Skywave," "Turbo Z," and "Z World" packages, all from JAM Creative Productions; the Q105 jingle melody, in its present incarnation, was modeled after that of "Z100," WHTZ in New York. (The jingles have since been discontinued from airing.)

On October 2, 2014, CBS Radio announced that it would trade all of their radio stations located in Charlotte and Tampa (including WRBQ), as well as WIP in Philadelphia, to the Beasley Broadcast Group in exchange for 5 stations located in Miami and Philadelphia. The swap was completed on December 1, 2014.

On October 5, 2020, the station announced the return of the MJ Morning Show, which originally aired on WFLZ from 1994 until 2012. This change resulted in Mason Dixon moving back to the afternoon drive-time slot. In October 2022, Dixon departed the station as part of nation-wide layoffs by Beasley Media Group.

Buccaneers broadcasts
At one time, WRBQ was the flagship radio station for the Tampa Bay Buccaneers of the National Football League, becoming perhaps the first top-40 station in the U.S. to carry live play-by-play sporting events. Jesse Ventura, the former professional wrestler and actor who later became governor of Minnesota, was one of the team's color analysts.

References

External links
Q105 official website

RBQ-FM
Classic hits radio stations in the United States
RBQ-FM
1954 establishments in Florida
Radio stations established in 1954